The 2015–16 Holy Cross Crusaders women's basketball team represented the College of the Holy Cross during the 2015–16 NCAA Division I women's basketball season. The Crusaders, led by thirty-first year head coach Bill Gibbons, played their home games at the Hart Center and were members of the Patriot League. They finished the season 13–17, 10–8 in Patriot League play to finish in a tie for fourth place. They lost in the quarterfinals of the Patriot League women's tournament to Lehigh.

Roster

Schedule

|-
!colspan=9 style="background:#660066; color:#FFFFFF;"| Non-conference regular season

|-
!colspan=9 style="background:#660066; color:#FFFFFF;"| Patriot League regular season

|-
!colspan=9 style="background:#660066; color:#FFFFFF;"| Patriot League Women's Tournament

See also
2015–16 Holy Cross Crusaders men's basketball team

References

Holy Cross
Holy Cross Crusaders women's basketball seasons
Holy Cross Crusaders women's basketball
Holy Cross Crusaders women's basketball